The 48th Annual Grammy Awards took place on February 8, 2006, at the Staples Center in Los Angeles, California honoring the best in music for the recording year beginning from October 1, 2004 through September 30, 2005. Irish rock band U2 were the main recipients with five awards including Album of the Year. Mariah Carey, John Legend, and Kanye West were each nominated for eight awards and won three; Alison Krauss & Union Station also won three awards; and Kelly Clarkson won two. Green Day were amongst the big winners, winning the Grammy Award for Record of the Year.

Performances

Presenters

Carlos Santana
Jenna Elfman
Bonnie Raitt
Teri Hatcher
Common
Ellen DeGeneres
Terrence Howard
Fiona Apple
Dave Chappelle
Matt Dillon
Chuck D.
Ludacris
Chris Brown
Tom Hanks
Alicia Keys
Stevie Wonder
Billie Joe Armstrong
Gwen Stefani
Sting
Queen Latifah
LL Cool J
Ben Roethlisberger
Michael Bublé
Jennifer Love Hewitt
Destiny's Child
Sheryl Crow
James Taylor
The Black Eyed Peas

Award winners
U2 was the night's top winner, with five awards. Their win for Album of the Year was their second win for that particular award. They previously won it back in 1988 for The Joshua Tree. They are the only rock act to have more than one Album of the Year win.

Top nominees included Mariah Carey, John Legend and Kanye West with eight each, but won only three awards each. Kelly Clarkson won two awards, becoming the first American Idol contestant ever to win a Grammy.

Multiple award winners (awards won/nominated):
U2 — 5/5
Alison Krauss — 3/3
Mariah Carey — 3/8
John Legend — 3/8
Kanye West — 3/8
Kelly Clarkson — 2/2
The Chemical Brothers — 2/2
Stevie Wonder — 2/4

General
Record of the Year
 "Boulevard of Broken Dreams" – Green Day
 Rob Cavallo & Green Day, producers; Chris Lord-Alge & Doug McKean, engineers/mixers
 "We Belong Together" – Mariah Carey
 Mariah Carey, Jermaine Dupri & Manuel Seal, producers; Brian Garten, John Horesco IV & Phil Tan, engineers/mixers
 "Feel Good Inc." – Gorillaz featuring De La Soul
 Cox, Danger Mouse, Dring & Gorillaz, producers; Jason Cox, Danger Mouse & Gorillaz, engineers/mixers
 "Hollaback Girl" – Gwen Stefani
 The Neptunes, producers; Andrew Coleman & Phil Tan, engineers/mixers
 "Gold Digger" – Kanye West
 Jon Brion & Kanye West, producers; Tom Biller, Andrew Dawson, Mike Dean & Anthony Kilhoffer, engineers/mixers

Album of the Year
 How to Dismantle an Atomic Bomb – U2 Brian Eno, Flood, Daniel Lanois, Jacknife Lee, Steve Lillywhite & Chris Thomas, producers; Greg Collins, Flood, Carl Glanville, Simon Gogerly, Nellee Hooper, Jacknife Lee & Steve Lillywhite, engineers/mixers; Arnie Acosta, mastering engineer The Emancipation of Mimi – Mariah Carey
 Mariah Carey, Bryan-Michael Cox, Jermaine Dupri, Young Genius, Scram Jones, The Legendary Traxster, LROC, The Neptunes, James Poyser, Manuel Seal, Kanye West & James "Big Jim" Wright, producers; Dana Jon Chappelle, Jermaine Dupri, Bryan Frye, Brian Garten, John Horesco IV, Manny Marroquin, Mike Pierce, Phil Tan & Pat "Pat 'Em Down" Viala, engineers/mixers; Herb Powers, mastering engineer
 Chaos and Creation in the Backyard – Paul McCartney
 Nigel Godrich, producer; Darrell Thorp, engineer/mixer; Alan Yoshida, mastering engineer
 Love. Angel. Music. Baby. – Gwen Stefani
 André 3000, Dallas Austin, Dr. Dre, Nellee Hooper, Jimmy Jam, Tony Kanal, Terry Lewis, The Neptunes, Linda Perry & Johnny Vulture, producers; André 3000, Andrew Coleman, Greg Collins, Ian Cross, Dr. Dre, John Frye, Simon Gogerly, Mauricio "Veto" Iragorri, Matt Marin, Colin "Dog" Mitchell, Pete Novak, Ian Rossiter, Rick Sheppard, Mark "Spike" Stent, Phil Tan & Johnny Vulture, engineers/mixers; Brian "Big Bass" Gardner, mastering engineer
 Late Registration – Kanye West
 Jon Brion, Warryn "Baby Dubb" Campbell, Just Blaze, Devo Springsteen & Kanye West, producers; Craig Bauer, Tom Biller, Andrew Dawson, Mike Dean, Anthony Kilhoffer, Manny Marroquin, Richard Reitz & Brian Sumner, engineers/mixers; Vlado Meller, mastering engineer

Song of the Year"Sometimes You Can't Make It on Your Own" U2, songwriters (U2) "Bless the Broken Road"
 Bobby Boyd, Jeff Hannah & Marcus Hummon, songwriters (Rascal Flatts)
 "Devils & Dust"
 Bruce Springsteen, songwriter (Bruce Springsteen)
 "Ordinary People"
 W. Adams & J. Stephens, songwriters (John Legend)
 "We Belong Together"
 J. Austin, M. Carey, J. Dupri & M. Seal, songwriters; (D. Bristol, K. Edmonds, S. Johnson, P. Moten, S. Sully & B. Womack, songwriters) (Mariah Carey)

Best New ArtistJohn Legend Ciara
 Fall Out Boy
 Keane
 Sugarland

Alternative
Best Alternative Music AlbumGet Behind Me Satan – The White Stripes Funeral – Arcade Fire
 Guero – Beck
 Plans – Death Cab for Cutie
 You Could Have It So Much Better – Franz Ferdinand 

Blues
Best Traditional Blues Album80 - B. B. King & FriendsBest Contemporary Blues AlbumCost of Living - Delbert McClintonChildren's
Best Musical Album for Children's musicSongs from the Neighborhood - The Music of Mister Rogers
Dennis Scott (producer) (various artists)

Best Spoken Word Album for Children
Marlo Thomas & Friends: Thanks & Giving All Year Long
Christopher Cerf & Marlo Thomas (producers) (various artists)

Classical
Best Orchestral Performance
Shostakovich: Sym. No. 13" – Mariss Jansons (conductor), Sergey Aleksashkin, Chor des Bayerischen Runfunks, Symphonieorchester des Bayerischen Rundfunks
Best Classical Vocal Performance
"Bach: Cantatas" – Thomas Quasthoff (soloist, performer), Jürgen Bulgrin & Rainer Maillard (engineers), Christopher Alder (producer)
Best Opera Recording
"Verdi: Falstaff" – Sir Colin Davis (conductor), Carlos Alvarez, Bülent Bezdüz, Marina Domashenko, Jane Henschel, Ana Ibarra, Maria Josè Moreno & Michele Pertusi, James Mallinson (producer), London Symphony Chorus, London Symphony Orchestra
Best Choral Performance
"Bolcom: Songs of Innocence and of Experience" – Leonard Slatkin (conductor) & Jerry Blackstone, William Hammer, Jason Harris, Christopher Kiver, Carole Ott & Mary Alice Stollak (choir directors)
(Christine Brewer, Measha Brueggergosman, Ilana Davidson, Nmon Ford, Linda Hohenfeld, Joan Morris, Carmen Pelton, Marietta Simpson & Thomas Young, Michigan State University Children's Choir, University of Michigan Chamber Choir, University of Michigan Orpheus Singers, University of Michigan University Choir & University Musical Society Choral Union, University of Michigan School of Music, Theatre & Dance Symphony Orchestra)
Best Instrumental Soloist(s) Performance (with orchestra)
"Beethoven: Piano Concertos Nos. 2 & 3" – Claudio Abbado (conductor), Martha Argerich & the Mahler Chamber Orchestra 
Best Instrumental Soloist Performance (without orchestra)
"Scriabin, Medtner, Stravinsky" – Evgeny Kissin
Best Small Ensemble Performance (with or without conductor)
"Boulez: Le marteau sans maître, Dérive 1 & 2" – Hilary Summers, Ensemble InterContemporain
Pierre Boulez (conductor)
Best Chamber Music Performance
"Mendelssohn: The Complete String Quartets" – Emerson String Quartet
Best Classical Contemporary Composition
Bolcom: Songs of Innocence and of Experience
William Bolcom (composer) (Leonard Slatkin)
Best Classical Album
"Bolcom: Songs of Innocence and of Experience" – Tim Handley (producer), Leonard Slatkin (conductor), Jerry Blackstone, William Hammer, Jason Harris, Christopher Kiver, Carole Ott & Marie Alice Stollack (choir directors), Christie Brewer and Joan Morris & University of Michigan School of Music Symphony Orchestra
Best Classical Crossover Album
"4 + Four" – Turtle Island String Quartet & Ying Quartet

Comedy
Best Comedy Album
Never Scared – Chris RockComposition and arrangement
Awards for composing and arranging:
Best Instrumental CompositionInto the LightBilly Childs (composer) (Billy Childs Ensemble)Best Instrumental ArrangementThe Incredits (from The Incredibles soundtrack)Gordon Goodwin (arranger) (Various Artists)Best Instrumental Arrangement Accompanying Vocalist(s)What Are You Doing the Rest of Your Life?Billy Childs, Gil Goldstein & Heitor Pereira (arrangers) (Chris Botti & Sting)Country
Best Female Country Vocal Performance"The Connection" – Emmylou HarrisBest Male Country Vocal Performance"You'll Think of Me" – Keith UrbanBest Country Performance by a Duo or Group with Vocal"Restless" – Alison Krauss and Union Station  

Best Country Collaboration with Vocals"Like We Never Loved At All" – Faith Hill & Tim McGrawBest Country Instrumental Performance"Unionhouse Branch" – Alison Krauss and Union StationBest Country Song"Bless the Broken Road" – Rascal FlattsBobby Boyd, Jeff Hanna & Marcus Hummon (songwriters)Best Country AlbumLonely Runs Both Ways – Alison Krauss and Union StationBest Bluegrass AlbumThe Company We Keep – Del McCoury BandDance
 Best Dance Recording
 "Galvanize" – The Chemical Brothers featuring Q-Tip The Chemical Brothers, producers; The Chemical Brothers & Steve Dub, mixers "Say Hello" – Deep Dish
 Ali "Dubfire" Shirazinia & Sharam Tayebi, producers; Deep Dish & Matt Nordstrom, mixers
 "Wonderful Night" – Fatboy Slim & Lateef
 Fatboy Slim, producer; Simon Thornton, mixer
 "Daft Punk Is Playing at My House" – LCD Soundsystem
 The DFA, producers; The DFA & Andy Wallace, mixers
 "I Believe In You" – Kylie Minogue
 Babydaddy & Jake Shears, producers; Jeremy Wheatly, mixer
 "Guilt Is A Useless Emotion" – New Order
 New Order & Stuart Price, producers; New Order & Stuart Price, mixers

Best Electronic/Dance Album
 Push The Button – The Chemical Brothers Human After All – Daft Punk
 Palookaville – Fatboy Slim
 Minimum-Maximum – Kraftwerk
 LCD Soundsystem – LCD Soundsystem

Film, TV and visual media
Awards for soundtrack contributions:

Best Compilation Soundtrack Album for a Motion Picture, Television or Other Visual MediaRay – Ray CharlesJames Austin, Stuart Benjamin & Taylor Hackford (compilation producers)Best Score Soundtrack Album for a Motion Picture, Television or Other Visual MediaRay – Craig Armstrong (composer)Best Song Written for a Motion Picture, Television or Other Visual Media"Believe" (from The Polar Express)Glen Ballard & Alan Silvestri (songwriters) (Josh Groban)Folk
Best Traditional Folk AlbumFiddler's Green – Tim O'BrienLive From Dublin: A Tribute To Derek Bell – The Chieftains
Come On Back – Jimmie Dale Gilmore
Live In The UK – Tom Paxton
Cajun Mardi Gras! – Jo-El Sonnier

Best Contemporary Folk AlbumFair & Square – John PrineChávez Ravine – Ry Cooder
The Outsider – Rodney Crowell
Why Should the Fire Die? – Nickel Creek
Devils & Dust – Bruce Springsteen

Best Native American Music AlbumSacred Ground: A Tribute to Mother Earth
Jim Wilson producer (various artists)

Best Hawaiian Music Album
Masters of Hawaiian Slack Key Guitar – Vol. 1
Daniel Ho, Paul Konwiser & Wayne Wong, producers (Various Artists)

Gospel
Best Gospel Performance
"Pray" – CeCe Winans

Best Gospel Song
"Be Blessed" – Yolanda Adams
Yolanda Adams, James Harris III, Terry Lewis & James 'Big Jim' Wright, songwriters

Best Pop/Contemporary Gospel Album
Lifesong – Casting CrownsBest Rock Gospel AlbumUntil My Heart Caves In – Audio AdrenalineBest Southern, Country or Bluegrass Gospel AlbumRock of Ages...Hymns & Faith – Amy GrantBest Traditional Soul Gospel AlbumPsalms, Hymns & Spiritual Songs – Donnie McClurkinBest Contemporary Soul Gospel AlbumPurified – CeCe WinansBest Gospel Choir or Chorus AlbumOne Voice – Saints Unified VoicesGladys Knight, choir directorHistorical
Best Historical AlbumJelly Roll Morton: The Complete Library of Congress Recordings
Alan Lomax, Jeffrey Greenberg & Anna Lomax Wood (compilation producers), Adam Ayan & Steve Rosenthal (mastering engineers) (Jelly Roll Morton)

Jazz
Best Jazz Instrumental Solo
"Why Was I Born?" – Sonny Rollins
Best Jazz Instrumental Album, Individual or Group
Beyond the Sound Barrier – Wayne Shorter QuartetBest Large Jazz Ensemble AlbumOvertime – Dave Holland Big BandBest Jazz Vocal AlbumGood Night, and Good Luck – Dianne ReevesBest Contemporary Jazz AlbumThe Way Up – Pat Metheny GroupBest Latin Jazz AlbumListen Here! – Eddie PalmieriLatin
Best Latin Pop AlbumEscucha – Laura PausiniBest Traditional Tropical Latin AlbumBebo De Cuba – Bebo ValdesBest Mexican/Mexican-American AlbumMéxico En La Piel – Luis MiguelBest Latin Rock/Alternative AlbumFijación Oral Vol. 1 – ShakiraBest Tejano AlbumChicanisimo – Little Joe y la FamiliaBest Salsa/Merengue AlbumSon Del Alma – Willy ChirinoMusical show
Award for Musical theatre recording:
Best Musical Show AlbumMonty Python's SpamalotJohn Du Prez & Eric Idle (producers & composers), Eric Idle (lyricist) (Original Broadway Cast including David Hyde Pierce, Tim Curry, Hank Azaria & Sara Ramirez)Music video
Best Short Form Music VideoLose Control – Missy Elliott, Fat Man Scoop & CiaraMissy Elliott & Dave Meyers (video directors) joseph Sasson (video producer)Best Long Form Music VideoNo Direction Home – Bob DylanMargaret Bodde, Susan Lacy, Jeff Rosen, Martin Scorsese (video director), Nigel Sinclair & Anthony Wall (video producers)New Age
Best New Age AlbumSilver Solstice – Paul Winter ConsortMusic in the Key of Om – Jack DeJohnette
Scared Journey of Ku-Kai Volume 2 – Kitarō
People of Peace – R. Carlos Nakai Quart
Montana – A Love Story – George Winston

Packaging and notes
Best Recording PackageThe Forgotten Arm
Aimee Mann & Gail Marowitz (art directors) (Aimee Mann)

Best Boxed or Special Limited Edition Package
The Legend
Ian Cuttler (art director) (Johnny Cash)

Best Album Notes
The Complete Library of Congress Recordings
Alan Lomax, John Szwed (notes writer) (Jelly Roll Morton)

Polka
Best Polka Album
Shake, Rattle and Polka! – Jimmy Sturr and his OrchestraPolka Pizzazz – Del Sinchak Band
Under the Influence – Eddie Blazonczyk's versatones
Time Out for Polkas and Waltzes – Walter Ostanek & Ron Sluga
Solecktions – Kevin Soleki

Pop

Best Female Pop Vocal Performance"Since U Been Gone" – Kelly Clarkson"It's Like That" – Mariah Carey
"Good Is Good" – Sheryl Crow
"I Will Not Be Broken" – Bonnie Raitt
"Hollaback Girl" – Gwen Stefani

Best Male Pop Vocal Performance"From the Bottom of My Heart" – Stevie Wonder"Sitting, Waiting, Wishing" – Jack Johnson
"Fine Line" – Paul McCartney
"Walk On By" – Seal
"Lonely No More" – Rob Thomas

Best Pop Performance by a Duo or Group with Vocal"This Love (Live)" – Maroon 5"Don't Lie" – The Black Eyed Peas
"Mr. Brightside" – The Killers
"More Than Love" – Los Lonely Boys
"My Doorbell" – The White Stripes

Best Pop Collaboration with Vocals"Feel Good Inc." – Gorillaz & De La Soul"Gone Going" – The Black Eyed Peas & Jack Johnson
"Virginia Moon" – Foo Fighters & Norah Jones
"A Song For You" – Herbie Hancock & Christina Aguilera
"A Time to Love" – Stevie Wonder & India.Arie

Best Pop Instrumental Performance"Caravan" – Les Paul"In Our Time" – Burt Bacharach & Chris Botti
"T-Jam" – George Duke
"Gero na Montanha" – Herbie Hancock & Trey Anastasio
"Agave" – Daniel Lanois

Best Pop Instrumental AlbumAt This Time – Burt BacharachBloom – Eric Johnson
Naked Guitar – Earl Klugh
Belladonna – Daniel Lanois
Flipside – Jeff Lorber

Best Pop Vocal AlbumBreakaway – Kelly ClarksonExtraordinary Machine – Fiona Apple
Wildflower – Sheryl Crow
Chaos and Creation in the Backyard – Paul McCartney
Love. Angel. Music. Baby. – Gwen Stefani

Production and engineering
Awards for production and engineering:
Best Engineered Album, Non-ClassicalBack HomeAlan Douglas & Mick Guzauski engineers (Eric Clapton)Best Engineered Album, ClassicalMendelssohn: The Complete String Quartets
Da-Hong Seetoo engineer (Emerson String Quartet)
Best Remixed Recording, Non-Classical
Superfly (Louie Vega EOL Mix)
Louie Vega (remixer) (Curtis Mayfield)
Producer of the Year, Non-Classical
Steve Lillywhite
Producer of the Year, Classical
Tim Handley

R&B
Best Female R&B Vocal Performance
"We Belong Together" – Mariah Carey
"1 Thing" – Amerie
"Free Yourself" – Fantasia
"Unbreakable" – Alicia Keys
"Wishing on a Star" – Beyoncé
Best Male R&B Vocal Performance
"Ordinary People" – John Legend
"So What the Fuss" – Stevie Wonder
"Creepin'" – Jamie Foxx
"Let Me Love You" – Mario
"Superstar" – Usher
Best R&B Performance by a Duo or Group with Vocals
"So Amazing" – Beyoncé & Stevie Wonder
"Cater 2 U" – Destiny's Child
"How Will I Know" – Stevie Wonder & Aisha Morris
"If This World Were Mine" – Alicia Keys & Jermaine Paul
"So High" – John Legend & Lauryn Hill
Best R&B Song
"We Belong Together" – Mariah Carey
Mariah Carey, Jermaine Dupri, Manuel Seal, & Johnta Austin songwriters
"Cater 2 U" – Destiny's Child
Rodney Jerkins, Beyoncé Knowles, Ricky Lewis, Kelly Rowland, Robert Waller & Michelle Williams songwriters
"Free Yourself" – Fantasia
Craig Brockman, Missy Elliott & Nisan Stewart songwriters
"Ordinary People" – John Legend
W.Adams & J.Stephens songwriters
"Unbreakable" – Alicia Keys
Garry Glenn, Alicia Keys, Harold Lily, & Kanye West songwriters
Best R&B Album
"Get Lifted" – John Legend
"Free Yourself" – Fantasia
"Illumination" – Earth, Wind & Fire
"A Time to Love" – Stevie Wonder
"Unplugged" – Alicia Keys
Best Contemporary R&B Album
The Emancipation of Mimi – Mariah CareyTouch – Amerie
Destiny Fulfilled – Destiny's Child
Turning Point – Mario
O – Omarion
Best Traditional R&B Vocal PerformanceA House Is Not a Home – Aretha FranklinBest Urban/Alternative PerformanceWelcome to Jamrock – Damian MarleyRap
Best Rap Solo Performance"Gold Digger" – Kanye West"Testify" – Common
"Mockingbird" – Eminem
"Disco Inferno" – 50 Cent
"Number One Spot" – Ludacris
"U Don't Know Me" – T.I.

Best Rap Performance by a Duo or Group"Don't Phunk With My Heart" – The Black Eyed Peas"The Corner" – Common featuring The Last Poets
"Encore" – Eminem featuring Dr. Dre & 50 Cent
"Hate It or Love It" – The Game featuring 50 Cent
"Wait (The Whisper Song)" – Ying Yang Twins

Best Rap/Sung Collaboration"Numb/Encore" – Jay-Z featuring Linkin Park"1, 2 Step" – Ciara featuring Missy Elliott
"They Say" – Common featuring John Legend & Kanye West
"Soldier" – Destiny's Child featuring T.I. & Lil Wayne
"Rich Girl" – Gwen Stefani featuring Eve

Best Rap Song"Diamonds from Sierra Leone"D. Harris & Kanye West, songwriters (J. Barry & D. Black, songwriters) (Kanye West) "Candy Shop"
 Curtis Jackson & Scott Storch, songwriters (50 Cent featuring Olivia)
"Don't Phunk with My Heart"
William Adams, Printz Board, Stacy Ferguson & George Pajon, Jr. songwriters (Kalyanji Anandji, Full Force & Indeewar, songwriters) (The Black Eyed Peas)
"Hate It or Love It"
Curtis Jackson, A. Lyon, Jayceon Taylor & M. Valenzano, songwriters; (Baker, Felder & Harris, songwriters) (The Game featuring 50 Cent)
"Lose Control"
M. Elliott, C. Harris & G. Isaacs III, songwriters; (J. Atkins, R. Davis & C. Hudson, songwriters) (Missy Elliott featuring Ciara & Fat Man Scoop)

Best Rap AlbumLate Registration – Kanye WestBe – Common
The Cookbook – Missy Elliott
Encore – Eminem
The Massacre – 50 Cent

Reggae
Best Reggae AlbumWelcome to Jamrock – Damian MarleyOur Music – Burning Spear
The Trinity – Sean Paul
Clothes Drop – Shaggy
Black Gold & Green – Third World

Rock
Best Solo Rock Vocal Performance"Devils & Dust" – Bruce Springsteen"Revolution" – Eric Clapton
"Shine It All Around" – Robert Plant
"This Is How a Heart Breaks" – Rob Thomas
"The Painter" – Neil Young

Best Rock Performance by a Duo or Group with Vocal"Sometimes You Can't Make It on Your Own" – U2"Speed Of Sound" – Coldplay
"Best of You" – Foo Fighters
"Do You Want To" – Franz Ferdinand
"All These Things That I've Done" – The Killers

Best Hard Rock Performance"B.Y.O.B." – System of a Down"Doesn't Remind Me" – Audioslave
"The Hand That Feeds" – Nine Inch Nails
"Tin Pan Valley" – Robert Plant
"Little Sister" – Queens of the Stone Age

Best Metal Performance"Before I Forget" – Slipknot"The Great Satan" – Ministry
"Determined" – Mudvayne
"Mein Teil" – Rammstein
"What Drives the Weak" – Shadows Fall 

Best Rock Instrumental Performance"69 Freedom Specials" – Les Paul & Friends"Beat Box Guitar" – Adrian Belew
"Birds of Prey" – Stewart Copeland
"Mercy" – Joe Perry
"Lotus Feet" – Steve Vai

Best Rock Song"City of Blinding Lights" – U2Bono, Adam Clayton, The Edge & Larry Mullen songwriters"Speed of Sound" – Coldplay
Guy Berryman, Jonny Buckland, Will Champion, Chris Martin songwriters
"Best of You" – Foo Fighters
Foo Fighters songwriters
Devils & Dust" – Bruce Springsteen
Bruce Springsteen songwriter
"Beverly Hills" – Weezer
Rivers Cuomo songwriter

Best Rock AlbumHow to Dismantle an Atomic Bomb – U2X&Y – Coldplay
In Your Honor – Foo Fighters
A Bigger Bang – The Rolling Stones
Prairie Wind – Neil Young

Surround Sound
Best Surround Sound AlbumBrothers in Arms – 20 Anniversary Edition
Chuck Ainlay (surround mix engineer), Bob Ludwig (surround mastering engineer), Chuck Ainlay, Mark Knopfler (surround producers) (Dire Straits)

Spoken word
Best Spoken Word Album
Dreams from My Father – Barack Obama

Traditional Pop
Best Traditional Pop Vocal Album
The Art of Romance – Tony Bennett
It's Time – Michael Bublè
Isn't It Romantic: The Standards Album – Johnny Mathis
Moonlight Serenade – Carly Simon
Thanks for the Memory: The Great American Songbook, Volume IV – Rod Stewart

World
Best Traditional World Music Album
In the Heart of the Moon – Ali Farka Touré & Toumani Diabate

Best Contemporary World Music Album
Eletracústico – Gilberto Gil

Special Merit Awards

MusiCares Person of the Year
James Taylor

Grammy Trustees Award
Chris Blackwell 
Owen Bradley 
Al Schmitt

In Memoriam 

Long John Baldry, Renaldo "Obie" Benson, Clarence "Gatemouth" Brown, Oscar Brown, R. L. Burnside, Little Milton Campbell, Vassar Clements, Tyrone Davis, Victoria de los Ángeles, Ibrahim Ferrer, Carlo Maria Giulini, Lalo Guerrero, Percy Heath, Skitch Henderson, Milt Holland, Shirley Horn, Willie Hutch, Johnnie Johnson, Merle Kilgore, Chris LeDoux, Harold Leventhal, Jimmy Martin, Robert Moog, Birgit Nilsson, Wilson Pickett, John Raitt, Lou Rawls, Eugene Record, Bobby Short, Jimmy Smith, Sammi Smith, Luther Vandross, Simon Waronker, Chris Whitley, Ronald Winans, Paul Winchell, Link Wray and Richard Pryor.

Trivia
U2's win for Album of the Year was their second win for that respective award. They previously won it back at the 30th Annual Grammy Awards in 1988 for The Joshua Tree. They are the only rock act to have more than one Album of the Year win.
Keith Urban won his first Grammy Award for "You'll Think of Me" From his 2002 album Golden Road
During the Sly & the Family Stone tribute performance Rusty Allen was in place of the original bassist Larry Graham. 
Sly Stone made his first public Appearance since 1987 wearing a Cockatoo-Style mohawk
While presenting Best Female Pop Vocal Performance Alicia Keys & Stevie Wonder led a sing-along of "Higher Ground".
Slipknot's win for "Before I Forget" was their first Grammy Award win.

Notes
 Steven Tyler & Joe Perry are from Aerosmith.
 "In the Midnight Hour" is originally sung by Wilson Pickett.
 "A Song for You is originally performed by Andy Williams from his 1971 album "You've Got a Friend". The song was written by Leon Russell.
 Neil Portnow made an appearance

External links

48th Annual Grammy Awards Winners List

References

 048
2006 in American music
2006 in California
2006 music awards
2006 in Los Angeles
2006 awards in the United States
February 2006 events in the United States